Roque Joaquín Gracia Sánchez (born 2 January 1951) is a Mexican politician from the Institutional Revolutionary Party. From 2000 to 2003, he served as Deputy of the LVIII Legislature of the Mexican Congress representing Veracruz.

References

1951 births
Living people
People from Minatitlán, Veracruz
Politicians from Veracruz
Institutional Revolutionary Party politicians
21st-century Mexican politicians
Deputies of the LVIII Legislature of Mexico
Members of the Chamber of Deputies (Mexico) for Veracruz